The Government of Cantabria is one of the statutory institutions that conform the Autonomous Community of Cantabria. It is the superior collegiate body that directs the politics and the Administration of  his Spanish autonomous community, and at the same time the holder of the executive power as well as the regulatory authority over said territory.

Election

Every four years there are the Autonomical Elections, when the electors of Cantabria vote for the political party that they want in government. The members of the elected Parliament of Cantabria must elect the President of Cantabria, and he must elect his counsellors.

Members of the Government

This is the government for the 2019–2023 period. They are members of the Regionalist Party of Cantabria and the Spanish Socialist Workers' Party, governing in coalition.

Public Companies

Here is a list with the public companies which depend of the Government of Cantabria:

 Cantur
 SICAN
 SODERCAN
 Gesvican
 Puertos de Cantabria
 PCTCAN
 SCS (Servicio Cántabro de Salud)
 MARE (Medio Ambiente, Agua, Residuos y Energía)

References

 
Cantabria